Anthurium quinquesulcatum is a species of plant in the family Araceae. It is endemic to Ecuador.  Its natural habitat is subtropical or tropical moist lowland forests. It is threatened by habitat loss.

References

Endemic flora of Ecuador
quinquesulcatum
Data deficient plants
Taxonomy articles created by Polbot